The Businessmen's Military Training Corps was a white and part-Hawaiian militia unit  to prevent collaboration of Japanese-Americans as a result of a Japanese invasion of Hawaii. The militia was made up of 17 companies, two thirds of which were World War I veterans.  Their main activates were patrolling, security, and battle planning. In response to their bias toward whites the Hawaii Defense Volunteers a predominantly Chinese-American militia formed.

See also
Business Men's Training Corps
Hawaii Territorial Guard

References

Anti-Japanese sentiment in the United States
Military in Hawaii
Paramilitary organizations based in Hawaii
White American culture in Hawaii
1942 establishments in Hawaii
1945 disestablishments in Hawaii